Nüümü Hu Hupi (formerly Squaw Lake) is a small lake in the eastern Sierra Nevada, near the John Muir Trail in John Muir Wilderness. The outflow of Nüümü Hu Hupi becomes Fish Creek, which eventually joins the Middle Fork of the San Joaquin River. The name was controversial because squaw is an ethnic and sexual slur, historically used for indigenous North American women. The name was changed by the United States Board of Geographic Names on September 8, 2022.

See also
 List of lakes in California

References

Lakes of the Sierra Nevada (United States)
Squaw
Sierra National Forest
Mountain lakes
Lakes of California
Lakes of Northern California